Richard Lee Daugherty (March 31, 1929 – March 10, 2009) was an offensive lineman and linebacker who played six seasons in the NFL for the Los Angeles Rams.

External links

1929 births
2009 deaths
People from Moundsville, West Virginia
Players of American football from West Virginia
American football offensive linemen
American football linebackers
Oregon Ducks football players
Los Angeles Rams players
Western Conference Pro Bowl players